John L. Bacon (November 3, 1878 – April 25, 1961) was an American civil engineer and Republican politician from California.

Bacon was born in 1878 in Illinois. By 1914, he was in San Diego, when he was on a Panama-California Exposition committee. He was a structural engineer and helped lay out the aquatic features of the San Diego Zoo.

Bacon was elected mayor of San Diego, serving from 1921 to 1927. An important issue of the day was the construction of water projects to enable San Diego to grow and prosper. After problems with water development, and as property valuations (and therefore taxes) increased, confidence in Bacon declined enough that in 1928 Bacon declined to seek re-election.

During and after his term as mayor, Bacon was president of Boulder Dam Association, a group that promoted funding for the construction of Hoover Dam, and was seeking a share of Colorado River water for use by Southern California cities.

Bacon died in 1961 in the city of San Diego.

Quote

1878 births
1961 deaths
Mayors of San Diego
California Republicans